Starhyke is a British science fiction/comedy series filmed in 2004, released on home media in 2009 and broadcast on television in 2011.

Starhyke began production in October 2004 and starred Claudia Christian of Babylon 5 and Jeremy Bulloch from Star Wars. In 2007, the producers aimed to complete post-production, and in March 2008 it was announced that this process was now finished. However, a later post on the official site stated that post-production would be completed at the end of September 2008, and that there was a private screening of all six episodes in Bristol, UK in November 2008.

Only six episodes were originally made. An announcement on the official site reported that the producers were "getting nearer to finalising a deal and being able to announce which channel has been lucky enough to add Starhyke to their spring schedule". Producer, Jonathan Brown, said in March 2008 that Virgin 1 and Sky One had refused the series while Five Life, Bravo and Paramount Comedy were considering buying it. As reported on the official website props, costumes and posters from Starhyke were featured in episode 39 of the BBC drama Casualty, broadcast on 24 May 2008.

The series got its world premiere at a press, cast and crew screening at the Showcase Cinema De Lux in Cabot Circus, Bristol on 8 November 2008. The series was released on DVD on 30 November 2009.

The series world TV premiere was on the Sky satellite channel Showcase TV in December 2011.

Scenario 
The show begins in the year 3034 when humans have become emotionless drones bent on expansion by destroying any alien species they encounter. A ship commanded by Captain Belinda Blowhard (Christian) called the Nemesis sets out to destroy an alien race called the Reptids, who plan to unleash a biological weapon that would reawaken all human emotion. The Reptids' aim is to unleash the emotion of compassion, hoping that the emotion would stop humanity from its destructive endeavors.

The weapon is released on the crew of the Nemesis as the evading Reptid ship time travels back into the early 21st century; the Nemesis, the only ship with time-traveling capabilities, pursues the Reptids to the past — only to be overwhelmed by their own emotions. Now lost in the 21st century, they aim to tackle their emotions while trying to discover a cure and prevent the Reptids from succeeding.

Trivia 
In an interview with David Clensy of the Bristol Evening Post in November 2008, the show’s co-creator Jonathan Brown revealed how making the show may have literally saved his life. 
He said: "Early on in the project, I discovered that I had a brain tumour. In fact, I’m very lucky. I wouldn’t have known about the tumour if it hadn’t been for the medical I needed to take to get insurance for the project. Thankfully, discovering it meant that I was able to have it successfully operated on. If it wasn’t for Starhyke, I mightn’t be here now."

Episode list 

 Disordered
 Lucy in the Sky
 Kill Jill
 Reboot
 Plug And Play
 Lock, Choc And Flying Hogs

Cast and characters

Cast 

 Claudia Christian as Captain Belinda Blowhard
 Brad Gorton as Commander Willian C. Cropper
 Fiona Reynard as Vilma Down
 Jeremy Bulloch as Doctor Yul Striker
 Mike Edmonds as Logan
 Rachel Grant as Wu Oof
 Rebecca Nichols as Nurse Sandy Beach
 Simon Lewis as Reg Duck
 Stephanie Jory as Sally Popyatopov
 Suanne Braun as Dotty-Ky
 Sue Witheridge as Daphne
 Wayne Pilbeam as Ensign Bull Ox

See also 
Advanced Warriors

References

External links 
 
 
 Starhyke Official Fanpage

2011 British television series debuts
2011 British television series endings
British science fiction television shows
British television sitcoms
Space adventure television series
British time travel television series
2010s British sitcoms
2010s British science fiction television series
English-language television shows